Owen Jenks Cleary (February 4, 1900 – September 10, 1961) was a politician from the U.S. state of Michigan.

Biography

Cleary was born in Ypsilanti, Washtenaw County, Michigan to Patrick Roger Cleary and Helen (Jenks) Cleary, and was married to Marie DeWaele. Cleary graduated from Cleary College, which had been founded by his father, and Owen Cleary eventually worked for the school.  Owen Cleary served in the U.S. Army during World War I. In 1938 he became president of Cleary University when his father retired. During World War II, the Governor of Michigan asked him to raise troops to replace the Michigan National Guard which had been called up to serve in the War and Cleary served as a brigadier general.  Cleary was also a lawyer and a candidate in the primary for Lieutenant Governor of Michigan in 1946.  Cleary served as chair of the Michigan Republican Party from 1949 to 1953.  He was a delegate to 1952 Republican National Convention and an alternate to the 1956 convention.  He was also member of Republican National Committee from 1952 to 1953.  Cleary was Michigan Secretary of State from 1953 to 1954 and defeated in 1954.  He was candidate in the primary for Governor of Michigan in 1954 and was the last Republican to serve as Secretary of State until Candice Miller took office in 1995.  Cleary was a Congregationalist and a member of the American Bar Association, American Legion, Moose, Rotary, Delta Theta Phi, Phi Delta Phi and Phi Kappa Sigma.  Cleary is interred at Highland Cemetery, Ypsilanti, Michigan.

References
The Political Graveyard

External links

1900 births
1961 deaths
Burials at Highland Cemetery
Politicians from Ypsilanti, Michigan
United States Army personnel of World War I
United States Army soldiers
Military personnel from Michigan
Eastern Michigan University alumni
Michigan lawyers
Michigan Republican Party chairs
Michigan Republicans
Secretaries of State of Michigan
American Congregationalists
20th-century American politicians
20th-century American lawyers